Irish Luck may refer to:

Irish Luck (1925 film), American silent comedy film directed by Victor Heerman
Irish Luck (1939 film), American comedy film directed by Howard Bretherton

See also
Luck of the Irish (disambiguation)
Irish for Luck, a 1936 British comedy film